Neshat Jahandari is an Iranian pilot. She is the first Iranian female pilot on a passenger airliner. She currently holds three records in Iranian aviation history, including first Iranian female pilot under the Islamic Republic, first female Iranian airline pilot, and first all-female crew. She flies the MD80. She became famous after her inaugural video went viral. 

She has flown 3000 thousand hours and is the youngest and only MD80 female captain of the Iranian airline.

Early life 

Jahandari Began her pilot classes at age 17, while studying for her degree in aviation flight engineering technology. In an interview, Jahandari admitted that she got her pilot's licence before getting her driver's license.

Career 
While no law in the Iranian Constitution prevents women from becoming pilots, Jahandari admitted that many considered it a male profession. She successfully became a pilot for Zagros Airlines. She used her platform on Social Media to encourage women to follow their passions, especially in countries were the law segregates the jobs.

Jahandari became internationally known as the first Iranian female pilot since the Iranian Revolution. Jahandari became Iran's first female certified captain in July 2019. Awarded four stripes, she is qualified to take full control of an aircraft, either on her own or supported by a copilot. In the aviation Industry. She began her career as a pilot with Zagros Airlines after passing her tests. In October 2019, Jahandari and Forouz Firouzi  became the first all-female crew in Iran. They were congratulated by IranAir CEO Farzaneh Sharafbafi.

Personal life 
Jahandari flies the MD80 for Zagros Airlines. She married Farbod Shahpasandi, who she says was one of the few people that inspired her and cheered her on to become a pilot.  The couple live in Tehran and Mashhad. Jahandari is prominent on social media after her two major accomplishments Many of her videos went viral on Zagros Airlines social media. She uses her free time to influence Iranian female youth into accomplishing their dreams.

References 

Living people
1989 births
Iranian aviators
Women aviators